Flirting with Love is a 1924 American silent comedy drama film directed by John Francis Dillon and starring Colleen Moore, Conway Tearle, and Winifred Bryson. It is based upon the short story "Counterfeit" by Leroy Scott.

Plot

Cast

Preservation
With no copies of Flirting with Love located in any film archives, it is a lost film.

References

Bibliography
 Donald W. McCaffrey and Christopher P. Jacobs. Guide to the Silent Years of American Cinema. Greenwood Publishing, 1999.

External links

Still at silentfilmstillarchive.com

1924 films
1924 drama films
1924 lost films
Films directed by John Francis Dillon
American silent feature films
Films based on short fiction
First National Pictures films
American black-and-white films
Films with screenplays by Joseph F. Poland
1920s English-language films
1920s American films
Silent American drama films